Shch-421 was a  of the Soviet Navy. She served in the Northern Fleet during World War II. She was led by commander Nikolai Lunin, before he was replaced by his second-in-command Fyodor Vidyayev.

Service history 
The submarine operated in the Northern Fleet and made torpedo attacks during 1941 and 1942, missing multiple targets and sinking one. On 19 February 1942, she ran aground in Skorbeevskaya Bay. She was refloated on 6 March and taken in to Polyarny for repairs. On 8 April 1942 the submarine suffered heavy damage in a minefield: with no more power and close to enemy shores, the crew built a sail out of the canvas cover and managed to move away from the dangerous area. All crew was taken onboard K-22 and the crippled submarine was sunk with a torpedo.

References 

1937 ships
Shchuka-class submarines
Ships built in the Soviet Union
World War II submarines of the Soviet Union
Maritime incidents in February 1942
Maritime incidents in April 1942